Electoral history of Vladimir Putin, second and fourth President of Russia and 33rd Prime Minister of Russia.

Presidential elections

2000

2004

2012

United Russia nomination

General election

2018

Prime Minister nominations

1999

2008

References

Vladimir Putin
Putin